Now That's What I Call Music! 36 was released on November 9, 2010. The album is the 36th edition of the (U.S.) Now! series.  With first week sales of 89,000, Now! 36 debuted at number four on the Billboard 200 albums chart. The album includes the number-one Billboard Hot 100 hit, "Teenage Dream". "Suspicious Minds", a number-one hit in 1969 by Elvis Presley, is presented here as a "flashback bonus track" in a remixed Viva Elvis arrangement.

Track listing

Reception

Andrew Leahey of Allmusic says "this compilation covers the usual ground" with the number-one hit "Teenage Dream" and "a handful of Top Ten singles ... thrown into the mix".

Charts

Weekly charts

Year-end charts

References

External links
 Official U.S. Now That's What I Call Music website

2010 compilation albums
 036
EMI Records compilation albums